Carol Clancey Harter (born June 1, 1941) was the 7th president of the University of Nevada, Las Vegas (UNLV) (1995–2006). She is the longest-serving president in UNLV history, at 11 years. From New York, she holds B.A., M.A., and Ph.D. degrees from Binghamton University as well as three honorary doctorates. She was succeeded as president of UNLV by David B. Ashley on July 1, 2006. Prior to her tenure at UNLV, Harter was the 11th president of SUNY Geneseo, where she was succeeded by Christopher Dahl.  She served as a faculty member and in two vice presidential roles at Ohio University and is the author of numerous articles and co-author of two books.  Harter is the retired Executive Director and founder of UNLV's Black Mountain Institute at UNLV.  She is Chair of the Beverly Rogers, Carol C. Harter Black Mountain Institute Advisory Board and a member of the Guinn Center for Public Priorities Board of Directors.

References
 UNLV Past President's site

1941 births
Living people
Binghamton University alumni
Binghamton University faculty
Presidents of the University of Nevada, Las Vegas
State University of New York at Geneseo faculty